Zapata County Independent School District is a public school district based in Zapata, Texas (USA). The district's boundaries parallel that of Zapata County.

In 2019, the school district received a B from the Texas Education Agency. In 2017, the Texas Education Agency gave the school district an accountability rating of "met standard."

In 2017, the Texas Education Agency gave the school district a rating of 74 in college readiness, compared to a target score of 60.

Schools

High school
Grades 9-12
Zapata High School

Middle school
Grades 6-8
Zapata Middle School

Elementary schools
Grades PK-5
Fidel and Andrea R. Villarreal Elementary School
Zapata South Elementary School
Zapata North Elementary School
Arturo L. Benavides Elementary School (San Ygnacio)

References

External links

School districts in Zapata County, Texas